Narayan Dharap (27 August 1925 – 18 August 2008) was a Marathi writer from Maharashtra, India.

He wrote more than 100 books in Marathi, primarily in the horror genre. Many of Dharap's novels and stories were inspired from contemporary American authors including Stephen King. Shapath was a story inspired by King's "IT" and "Gramma" (later made into the film Tumbbad). Narayan Dharap was also the first Marathi author to bring HP Lovecraft's Cthulhu to Marathi readers.  

Dharap earned a B.Sc. (Tech) degree from Mumbai University.

The main characters which can be found often in his stories or novels are: Samartha, Appa Joshi, Krishnachandra, Pant and Jaidev. There are assorted stories as well, in which there can be individual heroes/heroines who overcome a situation, sometimes with a little external help, sometimes without it. Most of his stories feature a great battle between good and evil, usually concluding with good triumphant. Some similarities can be found between a few Dharap's stories and Stephen King's. However, Dharap's stories seem to come from Marathi culture and Marathi readers, so the similarity is seen only in a few stories, typically in the area of plot and geography. Horror writing is still not seen with the reverence the way other types of writings are seen in Marathi literature. Narayan Dharap is loved by most of the Marathi readers who have some interest in the horror genre. He wrote some strikingly original stories based on weird fiction in Marathi, also he introduced fictional mythologies in Marathi horror literature for the first time.

The general characteristics of Dharap's books include "a victory of good over evil", "origination of the concepts in the book from Marathi culture", "keeping the story away from any kind of sexual references (which is considered an important factor in any "popular" horror or suspense literature)", "despite the books being of the horror genre, keeping the contents away from any kind of gore or offense against 'good taste'".

Main characters that can be found in Dharap's stories are:

Samartha: Samartha is one of the main characters that can be found in many of the Dharap's novels. He is a powerful saint-like person, who helps people out of difficult situations involving bad supernatural powers. He himself is a possessor of great supernatural power, which he has earned with great efforts. He is generally assisted by Appa Joshi, who is a common man with a good heart and highly esteems Samartha.

Krishnachandra: Like Samartha, Krishnachandra too is a possessor of great supernatural powers, which he uses to help people in trouble(again with bad supernatural powers/ possessors of those powers/people helping these bad powers). However, unlike Samartha, he enjoys worldly pleasures as well. He is sometimes assisted by a character called Omkar.

Pant: Pant is another character that can be found in a couple Dharap stories. However, he doesn't appear in as many books as Samartha and Krishnachandra do. He is a great Tantrik, whose prayer room can appear anywhere he wants. There are some brutal forces hidden behind the statues of various animals in those rooms, which help him to fight against brutal evil in the story.

Jaidev: Jaidev is an occultist with supernatural powers. He uses his divine abilities to help people and cure them from the attacks of evil forces. His appearance is very similar to Samartha.

 Samartha - 1968
 Kata 1970
 Angarika 1976
 Chaya 1971
 Samarthanchi sahase 1970
 Ubhe adave dhage 1969
 Krishna 1971
 Samarthanchi Shakti 1972
 Kajli 1970
 Bujagavane 1971
 Krishnachandra, Samarthachiya Sevaka, Chetakeen, Dast, Samarthancha Prahar, Shapath, Sathe, Fayakas

References

External links

विकिपीडिया

Marathi-language writers
1925 births
2008 deaths
Indian horror writers
University of Mumbai alumni